The 2001–02 Temple Owls men's basketball team represented Temple University in the 2001–02 NCAA Division I men's basketball season. They were led by head coach John Chaney in his 21st year. The Owls played their home games at the Liacouras Center. The Owls are members of the Atlantic 10 Conference. They finished the season  19–15, 12–4 in A-10 play. The Owls were invited to the 2002 National Invitation Tournament where they went 4-1 making the semifinals and winning the 3rd place consolation game.

Roster

References

2014-15 Temple Owls Men's Basketball Media Guide

Temple
Temple Owls men's basketball seasons
Temple
Temple
Temple